Lynn Berry may refer to:

Lynn Berry (NBC news personality), American television anchor and occasional co-host on Weekend Today; host of Early Today

See also
Lynn Norenberg Barry (born 1959), American basketball player
Berry (disambiguation)